Brett Sperry is an American video game designer, a fine arts gallerist, and a professional photographer. He is also a leading developer of the Las Vegas arts community where he's made significant investments in property and infrastructure, primarily in the Downtown Las Vegas area.

In the world of video and computer games, Sperry was co-founder and President of Westwood Studios where he created the Command and Conquer series, among other titles. During this time, Sperry was named the sixth most influential person in the history of video games. Westwood Studios would later receive the 2015 Industry Icon Award, presented by 2015 Game Awards host Kiefer Sutherland.

Background and education
Brett Sperry moved from his native Connecticut to the Las Vegas Valley in 1979. He later spent a year at Arizona State University, where he studied Psychology and Architecture. A self-taught programmer, he began his professional work with video and computer games in Las Vegas, Nevada where he performed for-hire contract work with Imagic and others.

Video and computer games

Westwood Studios
From a suburban Las Vegas garage in 1985, Brett Sperry and business partner Louis Castle created Brelous Software, with Sperry as president and Executive Producer. The pair changed the company name to Westwood Associates two months later, and in 1992 they again changed the name to Westwood Studios, reflecting their studio-like approach to the business.

As the company became more successful, Sperry and Castle entertained full buyout offers from both Sierra Entertainment and the Richard Branson satellite Virgin Interactive (a division of Spelling Entertainment Group). In 1992, Sperry and Castle sold Westwood Studios to Virgin despite a higher offer from Sierra, citing issues of greater freedom and autonomy. As Westwood evolved into one of the most successful video and computer game entities ever created, Sperry remained President and Executive Producer. However, in 1997 he took a larger role within the companies as Virgin Interactive's President of Worldwide Development, an internal attempt to turn Virgin's otherwise struggling video games divisions into a profitable enterprise.

In 1998, the Westwood library and assets were purchased outright from Spelling/Virgin by Electronic Arts.

Jet Set Games
In early 2009, Brett Sperry announced the collaborative launch of Las Vegas-based software publisher "Jet Set Games", a computer gaming company focused on mobile devices such as iPads and iPhones. The company's first successful release was the Highborn strategy game.

Las Vegas arts developer
Since 2007, Brett Sperry has been a central figure in the development of the Las Vegas arts community.

Brett Wesley Gallery and Artifice Lounge
Starting with a 2007 Downtown Las Vegas land purchase, Brett Sperry built and designed the award-winning Brett Wesley Gallery, becoming host to a succession of notable art installations, exhibits, and international artists. In 2016, Brett Wesley Gallery was named the "Best of the City".

Sperry then acquired additional parcels nearby, and with development partner Trinity Schlotmann created the Artifice Lounge, a multi-use "art-inspired" bar and lounge that Sperry designed from what was formerly an empty 1950's warehouse.

Art Square
Sperry made a sizable economic and architectural investment in the creation of adjacent Art Square, a 20,000 square-foot site with retail and professional spaces, desert gardens, a performance arts theatre, and a restaurant, all of which---apart from the restaurant---Sperry conceived and designed.

The Art Square complex was sold to Las Vegas Arts District Development in 2015.

The Modern Contemporary and Luminous Park
In 2009, Sperry became the spearhead and Chairman of a proposed $29-million international-class Las Vegas-based arts museum called "The Modern Contemporary". The museum and its grounds are part of a conceptual entity known as "Luminous Park".

Sperry's tenure as Chairman was contractually completed in 2014. Since then he has been an active member of the board of directors.

References

External links
 
 
 Brett Wesley Gallery

American art dealers
American video game designers
Dungeons & Dragons video game designers
Living people
People from Newington, Connecticut
Western High School (Nevada) alumni
Westwood Studios
Year of birth missing (living people)